Ulva anandii is a species of seaweed in Ulvaceae family that can be found in Buleji and Karachi districts of Pakistan.

References

Ulvaceae
Plants described in 1993
Endemic flora of Pakistan